Noée Abita (born 18 March 1999) is a French actress.

Life 
Abita was born in Paris or in Aix-en-Provence on 18 March 1999. At a young age, she dreamed of becoming an actress. In 2016, when she was 17, she went to a talent manager with a friend. She met Léa Mysius who was looking for a young actress for the title role of her first feature film, Ava. Although the role is that of a 13-year-old girl, Abita was selected by the director, because her real age and physical appearance are assets for the nude scenes provided in the scenario, even if she initially refused to undress for the film before finally feeling comfortable with nudity. For her part, Abita recognized herself in the character, because of her character and her eye problems. Her performance was hailed by the press, and in November 2017 she was shortlisted for the César Award for Most Promising Actress.

After Ava, she followed with a supporting role in Gilles Lellouche's Le Grand Bain and a main role in Genesis by Philippe Lesage. She then co-starred in Slalom.

Filmography 
 2017: Ava as Ava
 2018: Sink or Swim as Lola
 2018: Genesis as Charlotte
 2018: Vint la Vague (short film) as Mathilde
 2018: Odol Gorri (short film) as Eva
 2019: My Days of Glory
 2019: Apnea (TV series) as Chloé
 2020: Slalom as Lyz
 2022: The Five Devils
 2022: Les passagers de la nuit as Talulah

References

External links 
 
 
 
 Fiche de Noée Abita  on VMA

Abita
Abita
Abita
Abita
Abita